During the 2000–01 season, Everton competed in the Premier League, the FA Cup, and the Football League Cup.

Season summary
The 2000–01 season saw a major step back for Everton and the club once again fell into a relegation battle, not helped by long-term injuries to several key players. In the early stages the club had looked to be heading for another season of mid-table safety, but a terrible run of form in December and January plunged them into a relegation battle that they remained embroiled in for the rest of the season, ultimately not securing safety until they beat already-relegated Bradford City in their third-to-last match. The cups offered no respite, with the club suffering a humiliating fourth-round FA Cup exit to Merseyside neighbours Tranmere Rovers, who were struggling at the foot of Division One.

In March 2000 American cable television provider NTL approached the club with a view to purchasing a 9.9% stake in the club. Everton expected to announce a deal before the beginning of the 2000–01 season, but by October 2000 any chance of an agreement had disappeared leaving Everton with financial difficulties and forced to sell first team players, including Youth Academy products Francis Jeffers and Michael Ball, to balance the books – the board had already spent £18.4 million on purchasing new players including bringing back Duncan Ferguson, on the basis that an agreement was in place. Around the same time Paul Gregg had been negotiating a deal with United News and Media but this never came to completion.

Final league table

Results summary

Results by round

Results
Everton's score comes first

Legend

FA Premier League

FA Cup

League Cup

Squad

Left club during season

Reserve squad

Transfers

In

Out

Transfers in:  £20,995,000
Transfers out:  £13,700,000
Total spending:  £7,295,000

Statistics

Starting 11
Considering starts in all competitions
 GK: #1,  Paul Gerrard, 34
 RB: #2,  Steve Watson, 38
 CB: #5,  David Weir, 39
 CB: #6,  David Unsworth, 20
 LB: #12,  Michael Ball, 32
 RM: #7,  Niclas Alexandersson, 20
 CM: #16,  Thomas Gravesen, 33
 LM: #11,  Mark Pembridge, 22
 CM: #17,  Scot Gemmill, 26
 CF: #9,  Kevin Campbell, 29
 CF: #14,  Francis Jeffers, 12 (#8,  Alex Nyarko, has 21 starts as a central midfielder)

References

Everton F.C. seasons
Everton